Samuel Smith (1928-1989)  was an English World Cup winning semi professional rugby league footballer who played in the 1940s and 1950s.

Career
Smith signed on with Hull Kingston Rovers for the 1949–50 season.

During the 1952–53 season Smith was an ever-present, playing in every match alongside Arthur Palframan. That season, Smith represented Yorkshire against Lancashire.

In 1954, Smith was transferred from Hull Kingston Rovers to Hunslet.
Sam appeared 282 times during his ten seasons with Hunlet before moving to Doncaster.

International honours
Sam Smith won caps for England while at Hunslet in 1955 against Other Nationalities, in 1956 against France, and won caps for Great Britain while at Hunslet in the 1954 Rugby League World Cup against Australia, New Zealand, and France. (World Cup 1954 4-caps).

Sam Smith played  in all four of Great Britain's inaugural 1954 Rugby League World Cup matches, including Great Britain’s 16-12 victory over France in the 1954 World Cup final at Parc des Princes, Paris on 13 November 1954.

Sam Smith also represented Great Britain while at Hunslet between 1954 and 1956 against France (1 non-Test match).

References

In-line

General

External links

1926 births
1989 deaths
Doncaster R.L.F.C. players
England national rugby league team players
English rugby league players
Great Britain national rugby league team players
Hull Kingston Rovers players
Hunslet F.C. (1883) players
Rugby league hookers
Rugby league players from Kingston upon Hull
Yorkshire rugby league team players